Perjasica  is a village in central Croatia, in the municipality of Barilović, Karlovac County. It is alternately known as Gornja Perjasica. The village suffered large losses to property and life during World War II and the Croatian War of Independence. Inhabitants returning to the region after the War of Independence faced bureaucratic and legal barriers, leading to a steep decline in post-war population. Limited reinvestment in this area after the war has resulted in few operational public services, with no public transportation options, irregular roads frequently made impassable by snow, and limited medical access.

History

Demographics
According to the 2011 census, the village of Perjasica has 17 inhabitants. This represents 14.66% of its pre-war population according to the 1991 census.

The 1991 census recorded that 83.62% of the village population were ethnic Serbs (97/116), 7.76% were ethic Croats (9/116) and 8.62% were of other ethnic origin (10/116).

Sights
 Memorial to the victims of fascism and fallen partisans

Notable natives and residents

References

Populated places in Karlovac County
Serb communities in Croatia